Chailly-en-Gâtinais (literally 'Chailly in Gâtinais') is a commune in the Loiret department in north-central France.

See also
Communes of the Loiret department

References

Chaillyengatinais